Berthold III, Duke of Zähringen (b. c. 1085, d. 3 December 1122) was Duke of Zähringen from 1111 until his death.
He was the son of Berthold II  (c. 1050–1111), the first holder of the ducal title.

Berthold III was a supporter of emperor Henry V and was significantly involved in the Concordat of Worms of 1122.
He was married to Sophia of Bavaria, a daughter of Henry IX, Duke of Bavaria.
He was killed on 3 December 1122 near Molsheim in the course of a feud, and was buried at St. Peter Abbey.

He died without male issue, and was succeeded by his brother, Conrad I
(c. 1090–1152).

References 

 Ulrich Parlow: Die Zähringer. Kommentierte Quellendokumentation zu einem südwestdeutschen Herzogsgeschlecht des hohen Mittelalters (1999) 125–156.

1180s births
1122 deaths
Dukes of Zähringen